Jirès Kembo Ekoko (born 8 January 1988) is a retired professional footballer who played as a striker. His father is Kembo Uba Kembo, who played for DR Congo (formerly Zaire) national team in the 1974 FIFA World Cup. Born in the Democratic Republic of the Congo, Kembo Ekoko is a former youth international for France.

Early life
Born in Kinshasa, Zaire, Kembo Ekoko moved to France when he was six years old and lived in Bondy, Île-de-France with his uncle and older sister. His mother decided to send him to Europe for education, while his parents remained in Zaire (later renamed Congo in 1997). Kembo Ekoko was adopted by the Mbappé family, and is the adopted brother of Kylian Mbappé and Ethan Mbappé.

Kembo Ekoko began playing football in the street and was spotted by scouts while playing in school. At age 9, Kembo Ekoko signed with the youth team AS Bondy in 1997. Four years later, he would join another youth team, Clairefontaine. After three years of training, he would join Rennes. Upon joining the club, Kembo Ekoko soon joined the youth team and made an impression. Due to his technical qualities, he was nicknamed "Kembinho" by his teammates. By the end of May, he signed his first professional contract.

Club career

Stade Rennais

In his first season, Kembo Ekoko made his debut, coming on for Jimmy Briand in the late minutes of a 2–1 loss against Lille. Since his debut, he played very little on first team that season, which led him being linked with several clubs in the lower division, but the club rejected the bids.

In his second season, Kembo Ekoko's playing time was limited. Under Pierre Dréossi, Kembo Ekoko played his first game in the UEFA Cup against Lokomotiv Sofia in a 2–1 loss, before coming off for Jérôme Leroy. In the next UEFA Cup match, Kembo Ekoko set up a goal for Bruno Cheyrou in a 1–1 draw against Brann. At the end of the season, he earned French citizenship, and a call up for the France national team.

In his third season, Kembo Ekoko made 13 appearances and scored 3 goals, under Dréossi's successor Guy Lacombe. Under Lacombe, he received more playing time. In the third match of the Coupe de la Ligue against Le Mans on 24 September 2008, Kembo Ekoko scored his first Coupe de la Ligue goal in a 2–2 draw. As a result, he was linked with Reading F.C, although a bid was not accepted. The club would win 4–3 on penalties in the next round shootout to go through to the last sixteen of Coupe de France on 4 March 2009. Kembo also scored his first Coupe de France's goal in a 3–0 win over Lorient. A week later following his first Coupe de France goal, Kembo Ekoko scored his first league goal against Le Mans (the team he scored his first goal in Coupe de la Ligue). His performance suggested the club should give him more playing time, but he began to grow impatient with being on the bench and wanted more playing time. The club would reach the final of Coupe de France against Guingamp. Ahead of the match, Lacombe would put Olivier Thomert, Romain Danzé and Moussa Sow in three-way attack and the club is without injured Jimmy Briand and with the club losing 2–1, Kembo Ekoko came on as a substitute in a late minute for Bruno Cheyrou. In the end, Guingamp won their first title. Weeks after the final on 23 May 2009, Kembo Ekoko scored his second goal in a 3–1 win over Lorient. After the 2008/09 season, Lacombe would leave the club and was replaced by Frédéric Antonetti.

In his fourth season, many strikers like Briand, Sow and Mickaël Pagis all left the club but the club managed to bring Asamoah Gyan (his future Al Ain teammate) and Ismaël Bangoura putting Kembo Ekoko out of the first team. Despite being pushed out of the first team, he scored his first goal of the season in a 4–1 win over Toulouse on 20 March 2010. As his contract was set to expire at the end of the 2009/10 season, Kembo Ekoko signed a new contract, keeping him until 2013. Unlike the previous season, he barely received playing time at the club.

In his fifth season, Kembo Ekoko managed to make a return to the first team after Gyan and Bangoura both left the club, and received Víctor Montaño. This allowed manager Antonetti to give him more playing time He scored three goals in three games against Lyon, Auxerre and Brest. His performance led the federation of Congo to ask Kembo Ekoko to join the national team, in his father's footsteps, but he declined, insisting he should concentrate on his club career. During a match against Bordeaux on 12 December 2010, he suffered an ankle injury in the second half from Salif Sané. He would undergo surgery which was a success but he suffered a series of complications with a hamstring injury. After taking time to completely heal, he returned to training at the end of July, ahead of the new season.

In his sixth season, Kembo Ekoko came on as a substitute for Razak Boukari and after ten minutes, he scored the only goal in the game against French giant Marseille. Since then, he maintained goalscoring form, making him one of the most effective strikers in Ligue 1, but would lose his form in the second half of the season, although in the final game of the season he scored twice in a 5–0 win over Dijon. That win relegated Dijon after one season. In the qualifying round of the Europa League, he scored his first Europa League goal and set up in a 4–0 win over Red Star Belgrade. That win earned the club advancement to the Group Stage. He scored 13 goals (including all league and cups), the best total of his career since turning professional. In the summer, Kembo Ekoko was in negotiations to sign a new contract, as his contract would expire the following month. By early August, Antonetti announced Kembo Ekoko was close to sign a new deal. After Kembo Ekoko left Rennes for Al Ain, Antonetti said he was disappointed by his departure.

Al Ain
After one appearance for Rennes against Lyon, he joined Al Ain FC on a four-year deal.

International career
Kembo Ekoko was eligible to play for DR Congo or France, since he received French citizenship in 2008, and was called up for the national's team U21 squad.

Honours
Al Ain
UAE Pro League: 2012–13, 2014–15
UAE Super Cup: 2013

El Jaish
Qatar Cup: 2014

References

External links
Jirès Kembo Ekoko profile at Stade Rennais F.C.

1988 births
Living people
Footballers from Kinshasa
French footballers
France under-21 international footballers
Democratic Republic of the Congo footballers
French sportspeople of Democratic Republic of the Congo descent
Association football forwards
INF Clairefontaine players
Stade Rennais F.C. players
Al Ain FC players
El Jaish SC players
Al-Nasr SC (Dubai) players
Ligue 1 players
Democratic Republic of the Congo expatriate footballers
Expatriate footballers in the United Arab Emirates
Expatriate footballers in Qatar
UAE Pro League players
Qatar Stars League players
Sportspeople from Bondy
Footballers from Seine-Saint-Denis
Black French sportspeople